The Brasso Formation is a geologic formation in Trinidad and Tobago. It preserves fossils dating back to the Early Eocene to Serravallian period.

Fossil content 
Among others, the formation has provided fossils of:
 Dentimides
 Lepidophanes brassoensis
 Myctophum mundulum
 Neobythites huddlestoni
 Ophioscion transitivus
 Xenotolithus semiostialis

See also 

 List of fossiliferous stratigraphic units in Trinidad and Tobago

References

Bibliography 
 
 
 
 

Geologic formations of the Caribbean
Neogene Trinidad and Tobago
Paleogene Trinidad and Tobago
Paleontology in Trinidad and Tobago
Shale formations
Sandstone formations
Limestone formations